The Primera División A is the main league competition for women's football in Argentina. The tournament is ruled by the Argentine Football Association (AFA), with its first season held in 1991.

The competition was named "Campeonato de Fútbol Femenino" until 2016, when a second division ("Primera División B") was created so the championship was renamed to "Primera A" as it represents the first level on pyramid. 

Teams contesting the championship are from the region of Buenos Aires, which includes the Autonomous city, Greater Buenos Aires and La Plata. Apart from this competition, other regional female leagues exist around Argentina.

Boca Juniors is the most successful club with 25 titles won to date.

History 
The competition was first played in 1991, with 8 teams participating. The first champions were River Plate. Since 2009 the best team of the season wins the right to compete in the Copa Libertadores de Fútbol Femenino.

Since the 2011–12 season, the Association allowed non-affiliate clubs to play in the tournament as guest teams. Therefore Universidad de Buenos Aires (UBA) and Vélez Sársfield de Mercedes where the first clubs in that condition to take part.

In March 2019, it was announced that the league would become professional from the 2019/20 season. The agreement was signed by President of AFA, Claudio Tapia, and Sergio Marchi (representing the footballers union). The Association committed to give each club AR$ 125,000 for players' salaries. The AFA's facilities can be also used by clubs which don't have a venue to host their home games.

Changes in Argentine women's football also include the creation of a new competition (similar to men's Copa Argentina), named "Fútbol en Evolución", contested by teams all around the country.

Format
For the 2019–20 season (Torneo Rexona), the tournament has three stages, Fase Clasificatoria, Fase Campeonato and Fase Permanencia.

The first stage, "Fase Clasificatoria", is contested by the 17 participating teams. Teams play in a single round-robin tournament. Clubs placed 1st to 8th at the end of the competition, qualify to the next stage ("Fase Campeonato") while the rest nine clubs play the "Fase Permanencia".

The "Fase Campeonato" is contested by the eight qualified teams from the previous stage, playing a double round-robin tournament. The club earning most points at the end of the competition is crowned champion, also qualifying to Copa Libertadores Femenina.

The "Fase Permanencia" is contested by the nine teams placed 9th to 17th in the qualification stage (Clasificatoria). After a double robin tournament, the three worst placed teams are relegated to Primera B (second division).

Current teams 
Clubs registered for the 2023 season:

List of champions
Below is the list of women's Primera División champions:

Titles by club

References

External links
  (AFA)
 El Femenino website
 Primera A - Argentina on SoccerWay

1991 establishments in Argentina
Football leagues in Argentina
Sports leagues established in 1991
Argentina
Women's football in Argentina
Women's sports leagues in Argentina